Blingee (founded 2006) is an online animated GIF creator that allows users to create layered images using original photographs and artwork combined with user-generated ornamentation, referred to as "stamps."

History 
Blingee was founded as part of a website network Bauer Teen Network, and marketed towards young people who wished to add personalized imagery to their Myspace pages. The site, however, was different from other web-based GIF editors, allowing users to make their own profiles and other social network-like functionality. Users could also rate the Blingee compositions of others (referred to as "Blingees") and upload new artwork to use as stamps.

Closure and re-opening announcement 
On August 14, 2015, Blingee announced that due to infrastructural and business model-related issues, the site would be closing down. The management offered users a way to download their work from the site, while many publications offered eulogies. However, a massive fan outcry ensued, leading to the site securing the funding to continue operations, which it announced August 19, 2015. The forum post also announced that several previously premium features would now be free for users.

Use in art and pop culture 
Several prominent practitioners of internet art use Blingee as part of their practice or as an object of study, including Olia Lialina, Lorna Mills, and Mike Tyka.

The album art for M.I.A.'s single "XXXO" is meant to be a visual reference to Blingee, and the music video for the song features several headshots of the rapper pictured among glittering floral graphics like those common on the site.

References 

Image processing software